Élodie is a feminine given name. 

Élodie or Elodie may also refer to:

 ELODIE spectrograph at the Observatoire de Haute-Provence
 10726 Elodie, a main-belt minor planet
 Elodie (singer), Italian singer Elodie Di Patrizi (born 1990)